Kate Cole is an Australian actress who is best known for her work with the Red Stitch Actors Theatre, based in St Kilda, Victoria. She has also had guest roles on Australian television, including playing the part of "Go Go" Riley in the Australian soap opera Neighbours.

Filmography

Film

Television

References

External links

Profile at Red Stitch

Australian stage actresses
Year of birth missing (living people)
Living people
Australian television actresses